Dypterygia lignaris is a moth of the family Noctuidae. It is found in South America, including Costa Rica and Colombia.

External links
Records for Costa Rica

Hadeninae
Moths described in 1898